Garnik Shahbandari  is an Iranian football midfielder of Armenian descent who played for Iran in the 1976 Asian Cup. He also played for Bankemeli, Daraei and Ararat football clubs.

Honours 

Asian Cup:
Winner : 1976

References

External links
Stats

Sportspeople from Tehran
Iran international footballers
Ethnic Armenian sportspeople
Iranian footballers
Iranian people of Armenian descent
F.C. Ararat Tehran players
Living people
1954 births
Association football midfielders
Association football forwards
1976 AFC Asian Cup players